The 2002 V8Star Series season was the second V8Star Series season. It featured ten races at six European racing circuits, in Germany, Belgium and Austria. Venezuelan ex-Formula One and Grand Prix motorcycle racing driver Johnny Cecotto was crowned champion of the series for a second time, taking three wins in all and beating Austrian Robert Lechner to the title.

Teams and drivers

Race calendar and results

Championship standings

References

External links
driverdb.com V8Star Series 2002
speedsport-magazine.com V8Star Series 2002
motorsport-archive.com V8Star Series
V8Star Series official website

V8Star Series
V8Star Series
V8Star Series